Nuea Khlong is a district (amphoe) in Krabi province, Thailand.

History
The minor district (king amphoe) was created on 1 April 1992 by splitting off eight tambons from Mueang Krabi district. It was upgraded to a full district on 5 December 1996.

Geography
Neighboring districts are (from the northwest clockwise): Mueang Krabi, Khao Phanom, Khlong Thom, and Ko Lanta. To the west is the Andaman Sea.

Administration
The district is divided into eight sub-districts (tambons), which are further subdivided into 56 villages (mubans). Nuea Khlong is a township (thesaban tambon) which covers parts of tambon Nuea Khlong. Each tambon has a tambon administrative organization (TAO).

Economy
Tambon Pakasai has long been the site of an electrical power generating plant run by the Electricity Generating Authority of Thailand (EGAT).  In 1964, three 20 MW coal-fired plants came on-line adjacent to a coal mine that supplied fuel for the boilers. The plants were replaced in 1995 by a 340 MW generating plant burning natural gas and petroleum. EGAT plans to build on the same site an 800 MW coal-fired plant to come on-line in 2019, burning 2.3 million tonnes of coal yearly, imported from Indonesia, Australia, and South Africa. The development is estimated to cost 60 billion baht (US$2 billion). EGAT's plans have encountered significant resistance from local residents due to their health concerns and fears of detrimental environmental impact. EGAT counters by claiming that the plant will be a "clean coal" facility. Critics maintain that clean coal has never been successfully demonstrated at scale.

References

External links
amphoe.com

Districts of Krabi province